The Wisconsin Historical Society (officially the State Historical Society of Wisconsin) is simultaneously a state agency and a private membership organization whose purpose is to maintain, promote and spread knowledge relating to the history of North America, with an emphasis on the state of Wisconsin and the trans-Allegheny West. Founded in 1846 and chartered in 1853, it is the oldest historical society in the United States to receive continuous public funding. The society's headquarters are located in Madison, Wisconsin, on the campus of the University of Wisconsin–Madison.



Organization 
The Wisconsin Historical Society is organized into four divisions: the Division of Library-Archives, the Division of Museums and Historic Sites, the Division of Historic Preservation-Public History, and the Division of Administrative Services.

Division of Library, Archives, and Museum Collections 

The Division of Library-Archives collects and maintains books and documents about the history of Wisconsin, the United States, and Canada. The society's library and archives, which together serve as the library of American history for the University of Wisconsin–Madison, contain nearly four million items, making the society's collection the largest in the world dedicated exclusively to North American history. The Wisconsin Historical Society's extensive newspaper collection is the second largest in the United States after the Library of Congress. Visual materials in the archives include some three million photographs, negatives, films, architectural drawings, cartoons, lithographs, posters, and a variety of visual ephemera. The Wisconsin Center for Film and Theater Research is also housed within the division.
The society's archives also serve as the official repository for state and local government records. The society coordinates an Area Research Center Network, an alliance between the Historical Society in Madison and four-year campuses of the University of Wisconsin System throughout the state, to make most of the archival collections accessible to state residents.

Division of Museums and Historic Sites 
The Division of Museums and Historic Sites operates the Wisconsin Historical Museum in downtown Madison and 11 historic sites throughout the state. The museum has an archaeology program in collaboration with the Department of Transportation and the Department of Natural Resources that undertakes research, and collects and preserves historical artifacts. The other historic sites are tourist attractions that display historic buildings reflecting Wisconsin history and provide exhibitions and demonstrations of state history, such as ethnic settlement, mining, farming, fur trading, transportation, and pioneering life.

Division of Historic Preservation-Public History 
The Division of Historic Preservation-Public History administers the state's historic preservation program, the state's burial sites preservation program, and the Wisconsin Historical Society Press, which publishes books on Wisconsin and American history and a quarterly magazine, the Wisconsin Magazine of History. The division also provides outreach to local historical societies.

Wisconsin Magazine of History 

The Wisconsin Magazine of History is a quarterly journal published by the WHS since September 1917. The society maintains a fully digitized archive that contains more than 2,000 feature articles totaling more than 30,000 pages.

Division of Administrative Services 
The Division of Administrative Services provides support and planning for the WHS and its divisions.

The society's website include a large, searchable collection of historical images and a vast digital archive containing thousands of scanned documents relating to Wisconsin history.

Wisconsin Historical Society employees are employees of the State of Wisconsin.

Notable people 
 John Givan Davis Mack, professor of engineering and curator of the WHS library
 F. Gerald Ham, former Wisconsin state archivist and director of the Division of Library-Archives

See also
 Google Books Library Project

References

Further reading
 Buck, Solon J. "Recent Activities of the Wisconsin Historical Society." Minnesota History Bulletin (1915): 94–108. in JSTOR
 Schumacher, Ryan. "The Wisconsin Magazine of History: A Case Study in Scholarly and Popular Approaches to American State Historical Society Publishing, 1917–2000." Journal of Scholarly Publishing 44.2 (2013): 114–141.

External links

 
 Wisconsin Magazine of History archive of scholarly articles
 Legislators’ Guide to the Wisconsin Historical Society
Historical Society in The Buildings of the University of Wisconsin
 Teachinghistory.org review of WHS website, American Journeys

 
State historical societies of the United States
Organizations established in 1846
1846 establishments in Wisconsin Territory
Organizations based in Madison, Wisconsin
Digital history projects
Photo archives
Photo archives in the United States